Alpla HC Hard is a handball club from Hard, Austria. They currently compete in the Handball Liga Austria.

History

In 1986, the handball division was separated from the ATSV Hard club, and subsequently the independent club HC 86 Hard was founded. Under the guidance of coach Zoltán Balogh, HC Hard reached the Austrian top flight in the 1997/98 season. In the 2002/03 season, HC Hard won the Austrian Championship for the first time under the guidance of coach Frank Bergemann. In the 2004/05 season, the club won its first victory in the Austrian Cup. The club moved to its new home in the Sporthalle am See in 2005. The club won the championship 7 times in total (2003, 2012, 2013, 2014, 2015, 2017, 2021), the cup 4 times (2005, 2008, 2014, 2018) and the Super Cup 5 times (2012, 2017, 2018, 2019, 2021). In 2007/08, HC Hard reached the final of the EHF Challenge Cup, but won the final against Romanian UCM Sport Reșița with a score of 54:47 on aggregate.

Crest, colours, supporters

Naming history

Club crest

Kits

Sports Hall information

Arena: – Sporthalle am See
City: – Hard
Capacity: – 2400
Address: –  Seestraße 60, 6971 Hard, Austria

Team

Current squad 

Squad for the 2022–23 season

Technical staff
 Head coach:   Hannes Jón Jónsson
 Assistant coach:   Benjamin Trautvetter
 Fitness coach:  Stefan Jäger
 Masseur:  Martin Maier
 Club Doctor:  Dr. Michael Fink

Transfers
Transfers for the 2022–23 season

Joining 
  Nikola Stevanovic (RB) from  AEK Athens
  Frederic Wüstner (LB) from  TSV St. Otmar St. Gallen
  Sigtryggur Daði Rúnarsson (CB) from  Íþróttabandalag Vestmannaeyja

Leaving 
  Thomas Hurich (GK) (retires)
  Manuel Schmid (CB) (retires)
  Robin Kritzinger (RW) to  Bregenz Handball

Previous Squads

EHF ranking

Former club members

Notable former players

  Harald Beilschmied (2000–2001)
  Daniel Dicker (2014–2018)
  Wolfgang Filzwieser (2002–2007)
  Bernd Friede (1999–2008, 2010–2014)
  Guido Graf (1998–2002)
  Lukas Herburger (2011–2018)
  Maximilian Hermann (2018–2020)
  Michael Knauth (2008–2018)
  Roland Schlinger (2014–2017)
  Dominik Schmid (2008–2014, 2015–)
  Lukas Schweighofer (2018–)
  Nikola Stevanovic (2022–)
  Ibish Thaqi (2006–2007)
  Markus Wagesreiter (2005–2007)
  Robert Weber (2004–2008)
  Frederic Wüstner (2012–2018, 2022–)
  Gerald Zeiner (2013–2020)
  Boris Zivkovic (2011–2021)
  Srđan Predragović (2021–)
  Ivan Horvat (2018–)
  Bruno Kozina (2019–2020)
  Krešimir Kozina (2013–2015)
  Sigtryggur Daði Rúnarsson (2022–)
  Mārtiņs Lībergs (2003–2005)
  Risto Arnaudovski (2017–2019)
  Golub Doknić (2011–)
  Damian Wleklak (2007–2009)
  Stanislav Kulinchenko (2004–2007)
  Marko Krsmančić (2011–2015, 2020–2021)
  Mitar Markez (2014–2015)
  Luca Raschle (2009–)

Former coaches

References

External links
 
 

Austrian handball clubs